James Foster (born December 16, 1951) is a retired American basketball player. He was a 6'1", 175 lb guard born in Jersey City, New Jersey and attended the University of Connecticut and played in the American Basketball Association (ABA) from 1974 to 1976 with the Spirits of St. Louis and Denver Nuggets.

White was selected in the 1974 NBA draft by the Cleveland Cavaliers and in the 1974 ABA draft by the Carolina Cougars.

External links
NBA stats @ basketballreference.com

1951 births
Living people
African-American basketball players
Allentown Jets players
American men's basketball players
Basketball players from Jersey City, New Jersey
Becker Hawks men's basketball players
Carolina Cougars draft picks
Cleveland Cavaliers draft picks
Denver Nuggets players
Junior college men's basketball players in the United States
Point guards
Spirits of St. Louis players
UConn Huskies men's basketball players
21st-century African-American people
20th-century African-American sportspeople